John Delbert Van Allen was a retail dry goods merchant and department store owner who came to Clinton, Iowa in 1892 and established a department store that was the last surviving traditional store of its type in the city.  He is most noted nationally for having hired Louis Sullivan to design the Van Allen Building that is now listed as a National Historic Landmark.

Mr. Van Allen applied for membership in the Holland Society of New York on August 10, 1908 and was admitted on October 8, 1908.  He was a direct lineal descendant of Laurens Van Allen who was a resident of New Amsterdam in 1658.  (Application below)

Gallery

References
The Clinton Herald January 2, 1929

1850 births
1928 deaths
American businesspeople in retailing
People from Clinton, Iowa
People from Crystal Lake, Illinois